Independent Television is a Bangladeshi Bengali-language privately owned satellite and cable 24-hour news television channel owned by Beximco, one of Bangladesh's largest conglomerates. The channel commenced transmissions on 28 July 2011, and is headquartered in Tejgaon, Dhaka.

History 
In January 2010, India-based NDTV collaborated with Beximco with a goal of launching a Bangladeshi news channel, which was given a broadcasting license by the Bangladesh Telecommunication Regulatory Commission on 20 October 2009. Independent Television commenced test transmissions on 20 October 2010, and officially began broadcasting on 28 July 2011. It is the first television channel in Bangladesh to use the MPEG-4 technology to broadcast. Independent Television produced a quiz show titled Bangladesh Jiggasha, which premiered on the channel on 12 October 2018. In December 2018, the channel began broadcasting using the Bangabandhu-1 satellite.

Programming 
Independent Television usually broadcasts news programming. However, it also airs non-news programming, such as Ajker Bangladesh, which Khaled Muhiuddin hosted earlier. Other programs include Rat 9 Tar Bangladesh, Joto Khelam and Goal. It also covers shows on culture, business, entertainment. During several occasions such as holidays, Independent Television broadcasts special programming, such as Bazar Sodai, a shopping program aired on the last day of the month of Ramadan, observing Eid al-Fitr.

See also
 List of television stations in Bangladesh

References

External links
 

BEXIMCO group
Television channels in Bangladesh
Mass media in Dhaka
Television channels and stations established in 2010
2010 establishments in Bangladesh
24-hour television news channels in Bangladesh